Falkirk Rugby Football Club is a rugby union club based in Falkirk, Scotland. They currently compete in Scottish National League Division One, the second tier of Scottish club rugby. The club play their home matches at Cala Park.

History

The club's roots in Falkirk can be traced back through the Falkirk Herald Archives to 1906 when Falkirk Rugby Football Club was first formed. The club is recorded as having played at both the Tryst and Windsor Parks before they became a casualty of the First World War; although the game was still played at Falkirk High School, then part of the Midlands Schools Rugby Association.

For over half a century Falkirk did not feature on the Scottish rugby map until 1972 when the ICI Grangemouth RFC transferred its assets to Falkirk. ICI Grangemouth RFC had been in existence for over a decade, founded in season 1962–63 by ICI employees Bill McMillan and Lyn Jones. The club growth was restricted, however, by ICI and the decision was made to move to Falkirk and start afresh. Bill McMillan was elected as the first club president in 1972 and the clubhouse was opened by Harry Ewing MP in 1980.

For the first 25 years of the new club progress was slow and movement out of the lower league divisions difficult. Three successive relegations had taken the club to a nadir. Club members voiced their concern and a new administration took over in 1997 with Alex McQuade as president elect.

Since 2000

Thereafter the club's first notable appointment was that of former Scotland, Caledonia Reds, Dundee HSFP and Hillfoots prop John Manson as club coach. Under Manson's leadership the club won the Scottish Shield in 2007 and achieved five consecutive league championship titles between 2003–04 and 2007–08. These achievements were recognised by the SRU and culminated in the club being awarded the "SRU Club of the Year" for the 2007–08 season.

Honours

 Scottish National League Division Two
 Champions: (1) 2007-08
 Scottish Rugby Shield
 Champions: (1) 2006-07
 Rosyth and District Sevens
 Champions: (1) 1990
 McLaren HSFP Sevens
 Champions: (1) 1992
 Waid Academy F.P. Sevens
 Champions: (1) 1983
 Hillfoots Sevens
 Champions: (1) 1981, 1982
 Holy Cross Sevens
 Champions: (1) 1983
 Kirkcaldy Sevens
 Champions: (1) 2015

Notable former players

Glasgow Warriors players

The following former Falkirk players have represented Glasgow Warriors.

Scotland 

The following former Fakirk players have represented Scotland at full international level.

Notable non-Scottish players
The following is a list of notable non-Scottish international representative former Falkirk players:

References

Sport in Falkirk
Scottish rugby union teams
Rugby union in Falkirk